The 18th Cruiser Division (CruDiv 18, 第十八戦隊, Dai-Jūhachi Sentai) was a cruiser unit of the Imperial Japanese Navy. The division was part of the 4th Fleet and consisted of the light cruisers  and Tatsuta.

Organization
This article handles all Dai-Jūhachi Sentai collectively.

Commanding officers
This article handles all Dai-Jūhachi Sentai collectively.

Notes

Naval units and formations of Imperial Japan
Military units and formations established in 1940
Military units and formations disestablished in 1942
Military units and formations established in 1944
Military units and formations disestablished in 1945